Rare bird is an idiom.

Rare bird may also refer to:

Films
 A Rare Bird, a 1935 French comedy film.
 Rare Birds, a 2001 Canadian film.
Music
 Rare Bird, an English progressive rock band.
 Rare Bird (album), by American singer-songwriter Whitton.
 Rare Birds (album), by American musician Jonathan Wilson.